The Texas State University Department of Philosophy is an academic division in the College of Liberal Arts at Texas State University. 
It has particular strengths in applied philosophy, moral philosophy, environmental ethics, philosophy of technology and political philosophy.

Philosophy Dialogue Series
The Philosophy Dialogue Series is a forum for the "exchange and critical evaluation of diverse ideas". It includes about 60 presentations in each semester and has been held for over 20 years.

MAAPE
The Master’s Program in Applied Philosophy and Ethics (MAAPE), opened in August 2010, is the largest philosophy master’s program in Texas.

Accomplishments
Since the Ethics Bowl began, the Texas State team has won the regional competition several times and advanced to the national tournament.

Chairs
 Craig Hanks (2014-)
 Vincent Luizzi (1982-2014)

Faculty
Tisist is limited to those with. individual articles in wikipedia

References

External links
Texas State University Department of Philosophy 

Texas State University
Philosophy schools
Philosophy departments in the United States